Hah Myung-joong (Hanja: 河明中) (born May 14, 1947) is a South Korean actor, film director, producer, planner, and screenwriter. Hah started his career as an actor, but expanded his career to film directing, and film producing. Hah graduated from Kyung Hee University with a major in English literature. His brother Ha Gil-jong was a film director. His 1985 film Daengbyeot was entered into the 35th Berlin International Film Festival.

Filmography
*Note; the whole list is referenced.

Director

Producer

Awards
 1971, the 7th Baeksang Arts Awards : New Film Actor (약속은 없었지만)
 1974, the 10th Baeksang Arts Awards : Best Film Actor (나와 나)
 1975, the 14th Grand Bell Awards : Best Actor (불꽃)
 1978, the 17th Grand Bell Awards : Best Actor (족보)
 1983, the 22nd Grand Bell Awards : Special Award for New Actor (X)
 1985, the 5th Korean Film Critics Association Awards : Best Actor (땡볕)
 1991, the 29th Grand Bell Awards : Best Scenario (혼자도는 바람개비)

References

External links

1947 births
South Korean male film actors
Living people
South Korean film directors
South Korean film producers
Best New Actor Paeksang Arts Award (film) winners